Farewell, Starlite! is the debut studio album by American pop project Francis and the Lights, self-released on September 24, 2016, as a free stream. It is a follow-up to the 2013 EP, Like a Dream. Music videos were created for "See Her Out", "Friends", and "May I Have This Dance (remix featuring Chance the Rapper)". The album features appearances from Bon Iver and Kanye West, as well as production by BJ Burton, Benny Blanco, Cashmere Cat, Justin Vernon, Aaron Lammer, Rostam Batmanglij, Ariel Rechtshaid, Nate Fox, and Jerome Hadey.

Critical reception 

Ben Beaumont-Thomas of The Guardian gave the album 4 stars out of 5 and called it "fleet-footed modern pop with just the right amount of whimsy." Cameron Cook of Pitchfork gave the album a 6.4 out of 10, writing, "While Farewell, Starlite! has its share of engaging moments, it's a shame that under all its technical flairs, its overall mood isn't gripping enough to do justice to its creator's vision."

The Fader named it one of the "24 Albums That Made Albums Matter Again in 2016". The A.V. Club named it one of the albums of the year.

Track listing
Track list adapted from the Francis and the Lights website.

References

External links
 

2016 debut albums
Albums produced by BJ Burton
Albums produced by Benny Blanco
Albums produced by Kanye West
Albums produced by Cashmere Cat
Albums produced by Rostam Batmanglij
Albums produced by Justin Vernon
Albums produced by Ariel Rechtshaid
Francis and the Lights albums